John Jesnor Lindsay (born 1939) is a Scottish photographer who turned to the more lucrative trade of making blue movies during the late 1960s and all the way through the 1970s. A former student of the Glasgow School of Art, Lindsay had begun his career as a photojournalist with limited financial success. In a hint of what was to come later, by the late sixties Lindsay had turned to photographing nudes for magazines like Penthouse and Mayfair.

Lindsay filmed his short films on 16 mm film for distribution on 8 mm film, as that was the major market. Hardcore pornography was just around the corner, and by 1974, Lindsay had shot around 100 blue films for the 8mm market. Ultimately, Lindsay would become as synonymous with blue films in the 1970s as Harrison Marks had with glamour photography in the 1960s.

Works
Lindsay's most notorious productions were his so-called "Teenage" or "Lolita" series of films, in which adult actresses portrayed British schoolgirls in a variety of pornographic scenarios—although it seems the same two school uniforms were recycled from film to film. The titles of these jailbait themed films included Sex After School, Schoolgirl Joyride and most famously Jolly Hockey Sticks, which involved a middle aged lesbian gym mistress seducing one of her teenage girl pupils in the schools changing room after hockey practice.

While the "schoolgirls" who appeared in Lindsay's films were clearly nothing of the sort, on at least one occasion the settings were accurate. During his 1977 trial it emerged that at least eleven of Lindsay's films had been filmed at Aston Manor, a secondary school in Birmingham. Classroom Lover starred 19-year-old David Freeman, a former head boy, and Colin Richards, who was a school caretaker. Upon being found not guilty, Lindsay announced his intention to produce Britain’s first feature-length hardcore film and fight the British censor to have it released. Although the film never materialised, Lindsay was dubbed "the blue movie freedom fighter" by the press, an image he endorsed in adverts for his films which claim "I risked my freedom to give YOU the right to buy them." Several of his post-1977 films also open with a written notice that mention his trials and his not guilty verdicts.

Most of Lindsay’s blue films—it is sometimes claimed that he made in the region of 400—have basic, straight to the point plots and titles. Sex Ahoy features sex on a yacht, Convent of Sin finds two motorists falling foul of sex crazed nuns and Oh Nurse features sex between nurses and patients. A more eccentric title, Gipsies Curse (sic), sees a female gypsy attempting to sell flowers to a housewife who then bashes the gypsy over the head with the flowers. They get into a catfight that eventually ends in a threesome when the gypsy's husband (Timothy Blackstone) shows up. Sexangle and Health Farm (both 1975) are two of Lindsay's more ambitious efforts, running at over twenty minutes each, and the only Lindsay titles with any continuity between films as both feature the same lead character—the buxom Lady Samantha.

Other works
Lindsay also produced the feature films The Love Pill (1971), The Pornbrokers (1973), The Hot Girls (1974) and I'm Not Feeling Myself Tonight (1976).  At least two of these were also filmed in hardcore versions for export. The Love Pill is notable for starring comic actor Henry Woolf in at least nine different roles—Woolf is only credited with playing one part, but played several others under heavy make-up.  Lindsay also hired the famous "Page Three" model Flanagan to play a bit part in the film, although most of the women who appear in small nude roles in the film were in fact strippers recruited from a nightclub in Dean Street; the club was also the setting for a scene in the film. The Pornbrokers, a documentary style look at Lindsay's work in pornography, was banned by the British censor but passed as X by the Greater London Council for a limited release in the capital. The Pornbrokers received an unlikely plug in the 1974 comedy Vampira in a scene where Dracula (David Niven) and Teresa Graves go to see the film at the Jacey cinema in Trafalgar Square.

Apart from The Pornbrokers, Lindsay speaks about his career in Naughty (1971), directed by Stanley Long, Mary Millington's True Blue Confessions (1980), Sex and Fame: the Mary Millington Story (1996), and The History of Hardcore (2001).

He was also the stills photographer for Derek Ford's The Wife Swappers (1969), and can be seen in the film taking stills during the second version of the scene in which a woman is kidnapped on Westminster Bridge.

Legality
Lindsay had numerous confrontations with the law and obscenity charges made against him, most notably in October 1974 (with the jury unable to reach a majority verdict), 20 November 1974 (retrial: found not guilty) and July 1977 (found not guilty).

First trials
Lindsay’s 1974 defence claimed he was shooting pornography for export only and that, prior to shooting such material, Lindsay had visited Scotland Yard and been told he would not be acting illegally if he was shooting porn for release outside of the UK. However the prosecution’s case argued that Lindsay's films were being offered for sale within the UK and that a homegrown distribution network for his films did exist.

After the not guilty verdict, Lindsay began openly selling his 8 mm films in the UK anyway, and he also discovered a legal loophole in which hardcore films could be screened in British cinemas if they were run on a "Membership Only" club basis. Membership Only cinemas worked on the principle that the premises had to be privately owned, and that customers had to sign a form which instantly made them members. Such cinemas had been using this loophole to show soft core sex films since 1960, when Tony Tenser opened the Compton Cinema Club in London's Soho.  On account of this legal loophole, these cinemas were free to show material without it first being passed by the British censor, and would also be immune to prosecution under the obscene publications act.

By the early 70s, the staple diet of such cinemas were soft American films, albeit often with a violent S&M bent, e.g. Love Camp 7, Mondo Fruedo, The Smut Peddler.  Lindsay would be the first to introduce hardcore films to the membership only cinemas when he opened the London Blue Movie Centre in Berwick Street and the Taboo Club in Great Newport Street, the latter promising its customers "good uncensored porn in all its intricate cock raising forms." Other rival cinemas followed suit, notably the Cineclub 24 in Tottenham Court Road, the aforementioned Compton Cinema, and the Exxon cinema club run by David Waterfield in Danbury Street, Islington.

Further legal issues
Police interest in Lindsay's activities intensified towards the end of the seventies: his premises were raided several times and attempts were made to close Lindsay's cinemas on charges of "running a disorderly house". Undercover police officers had become members of Lindsay's cinema to gain evidence of this, in the hope of catching audience members masturbating. Lindsay alleges that an insider at Scotland Yard informed him that the police had been given orders to close his business down by all means necessary. In the early eighties, Lindsay had also begun selling compilations of his films on video, taking advantage of the then unregulated state of the British video industry, and selling them at £45 per tape through mail order (the tapes generally contained two or three films and uniquely, professionally made trailers for other Lindsay titles). Lindsay's Taboo video releases have since become collectors items and because of their scarcity are known to command high prices (a 1982 video of Betrayed and several other shorts recently sold for over £120 on eBay). In 1983, Lindsay's premises were again raided and he was sent to trial; this time he was found guilty of obscenity and served 12 months in prison. Lindsay alleges that the four videotapes seized that helped convict him were planted by the police.  Upon his release, he retired from pornography and opened a marine broking company in Kent. It is believed he may have recently moved back to his native Scotland.

Notable discoveries
The following began their careers in Lindsay’s blue films and would later move on to more mainstream work, usually in the form of roles in British sex comedies or walk on parts in sitcoms.

 Mary Millington appeared in several Lindsay titles and most notably the lead role in Miss Bohrloch before becoming the British sex symbol of the 1970s, thanks to appearances in magazines like Playbirds and Whitehouse.
 Pat Astley played the maid in Lindsay's End of Term before several years later appearing as Young Mr. Grace's nurse in the 1977 season of Are You Being Served, as well as roles in British sex comedies and the low budget horror Don't Open Till Christmas.
 Timothy Blackstone was a blue movie leading man in several Lindsay shorts. He occasionally had minor roles in soft core feature films and was an extra in the Doctor Who story Genesis of the Daleks. The brother of Baroness Blackstone, he was convicted of insider trading in 2003.
 Maureen O'Malley modelled and performed in blue films for Lindsay circa 1973. She is seen being interviewed and auditioning for Lindsay in his 1973 film The Pornbrokers. The authenticity of these scenes is questionable, but at the very least the film provides a reasonably believable reconstruction of O'Malley meeting Lindsay. O'Malley later went on to model for David Sullivan's magazines under the name "Miss Mary Whitehouse".
 Lisa Taylor appeared in the infamous Lindsay short Jolly Hockey Sticks and later acted in several British sex comedies such as Under the Bed and Let's Get Laid.

Partial filmography
 Miss Bohrloch (1970)
 Betrayed
 Oral Connection (1971)
 Wet Nymph
 Sex Angle
 Sex Ahoy
 Oh Nurse
 Desire
 Health Farm
 Jolly Hockey Sticks
 White Hunter +
 Convent of Sin +
 Triangle of Lust
 Boarding School
 End of Term
 Amanda at Night
 Fruits of Sin
 Hot Sensations
 Kiki and Lil
 Misadventure
 Sexational
 Sex kitten
 Untamed

+ -indicates films cited at Lindsay's obscenity trials.

See also
 Pornography in the United Kingdom

References

Further reading
 Sheridan, Simon 2011. "Keeping the British End Up: Four Decades of Saucy Cinema" (fourth edition) Titan Books
 Lindsay, John 1975. “The Sexorcist”

External links
 Taboo Films Collection
 
 John Lindsay in 2001
 

Scottish pornographic film directors
British pornographic film producers
Scottish photographers
1939 births
Living people
Movie stills photographers